Meshkan (also Romanized as Meshkān, Mashkān, and Mashgan) is a village in Meshkan Rural District, Meshkan District, Khoshab County, Razavi Khorasan Province, Iran. At the 2006 census, its population was 4,004, in 929 families.

References 

Populated places in Khoshab County